Novi may refer to the following :

Places and jurisdictions

Balkans 
 Novi Grad, Bosnia and Herzegovina
 the former Catholic Diocese of Novi, with see at Herceg-Novi (Castelnuovo), in Montenegro; now a Latin titular see
 Novi Vinodolski, a town in Croatia

Italy 
 Novi di Modena, a commune in the province of Modena
 Novi Ligure, a town north of Genoa, in the province of Alessandria in the Piedmont region of northwest Italy
 Novi Velia, a municipality in the province of Salerno

United States 
 Novi, Michigan, a city in Oakland County
 Novi Township, Michigan, the remnant of the unincorporated township now entirely within the city of Novi

Other uses 
 Novi engine, American auto racing engine named after Novi, Michigan
 Novi wallet, a digital wallet for diem, the digital currency from Meta (Facebook)

See also